Koszyce may refer to:
Polish name for Košice in Slovakia
Koszyce, Świętokrzyskie Voivodeship (south-central Poland)
Koszyce, Lesser Poland Voivodeship (south Poland)